The 120th Regiment Indiana Infantry was an infantry regiment that served in the Union Army during the American Civil War.

Service
The 120th Indiana Infantry was organized at Columbus, Indiana for three-years service beginning in December 1863 and mustered in March 1, 1864 under the command of Colonel Richard F. Barter.

The regiment was attached to 1st Brigade, 1st Division, XXIII Corps, Army of the Ohio, to June 1864. 4th Brigade, 3rd Division, XXIII Corps, to August 1864. 3rd Brigade, 3rd Division, XXIII Corps, to December 1864. 1st Brigade, 1st Division, XXIII Corps, Army of the Ohio, to February 1865, and Department of North Carolina to August 1865. Department of North Carolina to January 1866.

The 120th Indiana Infantry mustered out of service January 8, 1866.

Detailed service
Left Indiana for Louisville, Kentucky, March 20, 1864; then moved to Nashville, Tennessee. Marched to Charleston, Tennessee, April 7–24, 1864. Atlanta Campaign May 1 to September 8, 1864. Demonstrations on Dalton May 8–13. Rocky Faced Ridge May 8–11. Battle of Resaca May 14–15. Movements on Dallas May 18–25. Operations on line of Pumpkin Vine Creek and battles about Dallas, New Hope Church, and Allatoona Hills May 25 – June 5. Cassville May 27. Operations about Marietta and against Kennesaw Mountain June 10 – July 2. Lost Mountain June 15–17. Muddy Creek June 17. Noyes Creek June 19. Assault on Kennesaw June 27. Nickajack Creek July 2–5. Chattahoochie River July 5–17. Siege of Atlanta July 22 – August 25. Utoy Creek August 5–7. Flank movement on Jonesborough August 25–30. Lovejoy's Station September 2–6. Operations in northern Georgia and northern Alabama against Hood September 29 – November 3. Nashville Campaign November–December. In front of Columbia November 24–27. Battle of Franklin November 30. Battle of Nashville December 15–16. Pursuit of Hood to the Tennessee River December 17–28. At Clifton, Tennessee, until January 15, 1865. Movement to Washington, D.C., then to Morehead City, North Carolina, January 15 – February 24. Campaign of the Carolinas March 1 – April 26. Advance on Kinston and Goldsboro March 1–21. Battle of Wyse Fork March 8–10. Kinston March 11. Occupation of Goldsboro March 21. Advance on Raleigh April 10–14. Occupation of Raleigh April 14. Bennett's House April 26. Surrender of Johnston and his army. Duty at Raleigh until May 10. At Charlotte and Greensboro, North Carolina, until August 21, and at Raleigh until January 1866.

Casualties
The regiment lost a total of 168 men during service; 1 officer and 26 enlisted men killed or mortally wounded, 1 officer and 140 enlisted men died of disease.

Commanders
 Colonel Richard F. Barter - resigned August 8, 1864
 Colonel Allen W. Prather - resigned August 30, 1865
 Colonel Reuben C. Kise
 Major John M. Barcus - commanded at the Battle of Nashville

See also

 List of Indiana Civil War regiments
 Indiana in the Civil War

References
 Dyer, Frederick H. A Compendium of the War of the Rebellion (Des Moines, IA: Dyer Pub. Co.), 1908.
 Phillips, John. Marching with Sherman: The Story of Company K of the 120th Indiana Infantry (Cabin John, MD: The Author), 1988.
Attribution
 

Military units and formations established in 1863
Military units and formations disestablished in 1866
Units and formations of the Union Army from Indiana
1863 establishments in Indiana
1866 disestablishments in Indiana